David P. Schmitt is a personality psychologist who founded the International Sexuality Description Project (ISDP). The ISDP is the largest-ever cross-cultural research study on sex and personality. Over 100 psychologists simultaneously administered an anonymous self-report survey to 17,837 individuals representing 56 different nations, 6 continents, 13 islands, and 30 languages. Direct assessments of people's personality traits and sexual behaviors have led to innovative tests of evolutionary psychology and social role theory. A second wave of the ISDP is currently underway and includes measures of subjective well-being, social dominance, sexual aggression, rape attitudes, HIV risk, and psychopathy.

David Schmitt also blogs in Psychology Today

Publications
 Schmitt, D.P. (2005). Sociosexuality from Argentina to Zimbabwe: A 48-nation study of sex, culture, and strategies of human mating. Behavioral and Brain Sciences, 28, 247–311.
  Schmitt, D.P., Alcalay, L., Allensworth, M., Allik, J., Ault, L., Austers, I., et al. (2004). Patterns and universals of adult romantic attachment across 62 cultural regions: Are models of self and of other pancultural constructs? Journal of Cross-Cultural Psychology, 35, 367–402.
 Schmitt, D.P., Alcalay, L., Allik, J., Angleiter, A., Ault, L., Austers, I., et al. (2004). Patterns and universals of mate poaching across 53 nations: The effects of sex, culture, and personality on romantically attracting another person's partner. Journal of Personality and Social Psychology, 86, 560–584.
 Schmitt, D., et al. (2003). Universal sex differences in the desire for sexual variety: Tests from 52 nations, 6 continents, and 13 islands. Journal of Personality and Social Psychology, 85, 85–104.
 Schmitt, D.P, Shackelford, T.K., Duntely, J., Tooke, W., Buss, D.M., Fisher, M.L., Lavallee, M., & Vasey, P. (2002). Is there an early-30s peak in female sexual desire? Cross-sectional evidence from the United States and Canada. The Canadian Journal of Human Sexuality, 11, 1–18.

References

External links
 Bradley University: David Schmitt
 SPN profile

Evolutionary psychologists
21st-century American psychologists
Cross-cultural studies
Living people
University of Michigan alumni
Year of birth missing (living people)